Bobby Eugene Phillips II (born December 8, 1969) is a former American football running back who played professionally in the National Football League (NFL).

Phillips was born in Richmond, Virginia and attended John Marshall High School. He played collegiately at Virginia Union and was signed by the Minnesota Vikings as an undrafted free agent.

Living people
1969 births
American football running backs
Players of American football from Richmond, Virginia
Virginia Union Panthers football players
Minnesota Vikings players